The Adonis Factor is  a 2010 documentary film produced and directed by American director Christopher Hines through his own production company Rogue Culture Inc. Filmed at various locations, it was shown at a number of gay and documentary festivals. The television premiere was April 2, 2011 on the gay channel Logo.

Christopher Hines' The Adonis Factor is a follow up to another, The Butch Factor, that tackled gay culture and masculinity.

Synopsis
Hines' film examines issues of body image in the gay community.

Cast
(All appearing as themselves)
Anthony O'Brien - Law enforcement officer
Shane Stiel - Disc Jockey / Producer
Graig Keyte - Interior Designer
Mike Wood - Instinct Editor in chief
Bruce Vilanch - Writer and actor
Anderson Davis - Actor and model
John Ganun - Photographer.
Quentin Elias - Singer, model
Dr Gregory Cason - Psychologist
Dr Tim Jochen - Dermatologist
Justin Gaines - Bartender and student
Richard Klein - Go-Go dancer
Derek Brocklehurst - interviewee
Justin Donahue - interviewee
Eric Pyne - Urban body fitness trainer
Neil Samarripa - Urban body fitness trainer
Juan Pablo Zuluaga - Former "Mr Hot Atlanta"
Scott Cullens - Company director
Jeffrey Sanker - Party promoter
Melvin Myles - Party Participant
Dr Scott Parry - Steroid abuse advisor
Gabriel Perez 
Deandre Johnson 
Nic Delis
Jallen Rix - Sexologist.
Brian Mills - Titan Men director
Christopher Saint - Titan model
Dakota Rivers - Titan model
Darren Main - Naked yoga instructor
Steve Waye - Naked yoga student
Fred Goldsmith - Community initiative
Rick Esparza - Ice hockey player.
Clint Catalyst - model
Stacey Hummell - Make-up artist
Ryan May
Jonathan Miller
Jeff Pray - Proud Bears
Michael Sigmann - Men's Inner Journey
John Moore and Ryan Cummings - Life Partners
Dr Derek Jones - Dermatologist
Dr Greg Mueller - Plastic Surgeon
Albert Wyss - Former cover model

Screenings
Frameline Film Festival, San Francisco—World Premiere
Queer Doc Festival, Sydney, Australia
Oslo Gay & Lesbian Film Festival
Out on Film, Atlanta, Georgia
Tampa International Gay & Lesbian Film FestivaI
ImageOut: Rochester LGBT Film and Video Festival
Seattle LGBT Film Festival
Southwest Gay and Lesbian Festival, 
Indianapolis Gay Film Festival 
Image+Nation, Montreal
Festival Mix Brazil 
Brisbane, Australia Queer Film Festival

References

External links
Official website

Facebook

2010 films
2010 documentary films
2010 LGBT-related films
American documentary films
American LGBT-related films
Body image in popular culture
Documentary films about gay men
2010s English-language films
Gay masculinity
2010s American films